The Meghalaya High Court is the High Court of the state of Meghalaya.  It was established in March 2013, after making suitable amendments in the Constitution of India and North-Eastern Areas (Re-organisation) Act of 1971. Earlier, a bench of the Gauhati High Court had jurisdiction over the state of Meghalaya. The seat of the High Court is at Shillong, the capital of Meghalaya. This court has four permanent judges, including the Hon'ble Chief Justice, and three Hon'ble Judges.

The current Chief Justice is Hon'ble Justice Sanjib Banerjee who took charge on 24 November 2021.

List of Chief Justices 
There have been eleven chief justices of the Meghalaya High Court, out of whom two were elevated as judges of the Supreme Court of India, Prafulla Chandra Pant and Dinesh Maheshwari

References

External links
Meghalaya High Court

Government of Meghalaya
2013 establishments in Meghalaya
 
Courts and tribunals established in 2013